Djamel Leeflang (born 25 March 1992) is a Dutch footballer currently playing for FC Lienden. Known for his technical ability, teamwork and versatility.

Leeflang born in Utrecht, The Netherlands, started his career in his home country with Vitesse Delft. At 20 years old making his first move overseas, to Indonesia and signing with Premier League side Deltras F.C. His first season in the Liga Indonesia Premier Division was a successful one with massive haul of 14 goals and 8 assists from 23 games, including a hat trick against current Liga 1 club Persib Bandung.

Returning to The Netherlands with VV Haaglandia followed by an unfortunate trial that was cut short due to injury at Dutch Premier League side, Sparta Rotterdam, Leeflang joined Valletta F.C, finishing second in the Premier League and qualifying for the Europa League.

After a season and a half at Qormi Djamel moved to New Radiant Sports Club in the Maldives. A year that ended with New Radiant winning the Dhivehi Premier League and two cup competitions.

The 2017/2018 campaign saw a return to Malta with Lija Athletic F.C. who were getting ready for their return to the Maltese Premier League after an 18-year absence.

In February 2018 Leeflang completed a return to Indonesia to play for Perseru Serui in Liga 1. Djamel then returned to Europe to sign a short term deal with Havant & Waterlooville in November 2018, making 5 appearances.

Before the end of the January 2019 transfer window, Leeflang signed until June 2020 with FC Lienden.

References

External links

 Djamel Leeflang Interview
 Djamel Leeflang Interview with Elfvoetbal

1992 births
Living people
Footballers from Utrecht (city)
Dutch footballers
Dutch expatriate footballers
Association football midfielders
Deltras F.C. players
Haaglandia players
Valletta F.C. players
Qormi F.C. players
New Radiant S.C. players
Lija Athletic F.C. players
Perseru Serui players
Havant & Waterlooville F.C. players
FC Lienden players
Indonesian Premier League players
Derde Divisie players
Maltese Premier League players
Liga 1 (Indonesia) players
Tweede Divisie players
Expatriate footballers in Indonesia
Dutch expatriate sportspeople in Indonesia
Expatriate footballers in Malta
Dutch expatriate sportspeople in Malta
Expatriate footballers in the Maldives
Dutch expatriate sportspeople in the Maldives
Expatriate footballers in England
Dutch expatriate sportspeople in England